Panubulon Island (or Panobolon Island) is an island barangay located southeast of Nueva Valencia, Guimaras in the Philippines. Beside Panubulon is Guiuanon Island. This island was affected by an oil spill last August 11, 2006.

See also

 List of islands of the Philippines

External links
 Panubulon Island at OpenStreetMap

Islands of Guimaras